Calderside Academy is a Scottish secondary school in Blantyre. It was created by merging two local secondary schools (Blantyre High School and Earnock High School) on the land where Blantyre High School was. The school opened in January 2008 and was ceremonially opened by Fiona Hyslop MSP in November 2008.

The Academy has approximately 1400 pupils and around 100 teachers, making it one of the largest schools in Scotland.

House groups

Calderside Academy divides its pupils into four different house groups: Lewis, Skye, Mull, and Arran. Out of all these houses Arran has the fewest pupils.

References

External links
School website
Blantyre High School (tagged articles) at The Blantyre Project

Secondary schools in South Lanarkshire
Educational institutions established in 2008
Blantyre, South Lanarkshire
Hamilton, South Lanarkshire
2008 establishments in Scotland
School buildings completed in 2008